Pransukh Manilal Nayak (23 April 1910 – 12 March 1989) was an Indian Gujarati theatre actor, director, manager, and playwright from Gujarat, India. Born into a family of traditional theatre actors, he joined theatre troupes at a young age and rose to fame for his comic roles and female impersonations. His performances as a woman from Banaras in Kumali Kali and as Jivram Bhatt in Mithyabhiman were acclaimed. During his long career, he worked with many theatre companies and gave 22,455 performances, earning a listing in the 1989 Guinness Book of Records.

Early life 
Pransukh Nayak was born on 23 April 1910 in a village called Jagudan, which is now in Mehsana district, Gujarat, to a family of traditional Bhavai actors. His father Manilal Mulchand was a popular Bhavai actor and the people of nearby villages flocked to see his performances in veshas (acts) of Ramapir and Chhelbatau. Pransukh had participated in one performance when he was around seven or eight years old. He studied two levels in a Gujarati school.

Career 
Nayak was inspired by a performance by female impersonator Jaishankar Sundari to join a Bhavai troupe at the age of nine. He joined Deshi Natak Samaj in Surat, where he played female impersonator roles. He later worked with Aryaniti Natak Samaj—owned by Motiram Nandwana—and Vidyavinod Natak Samaj owned by Pyarelal Viththalrao Mehta. He later joined Mumbai Gujarati Natak Mandali, where he was trained under Surajram Nayak, Jaishankar Sundari and Bapulal Nayak. In Mumbai, he appeared in a supporting female role as Kashi—a woman from Banaras—in Kumali Kali (Delicate Bud, 1926), and later in College Kanya (College Girl, 1925), which brought him fame in the Bombay theatre circuit (now Mumbai) at the age of fifteen. He received his nickname Lucknowri Tetar due to his role in Kumali Kali. He later diversified his performances, mostly in comic roles. He also acted in Jugal Jugari (Jugal the Gambler, 1902), Vijya Kalyani, Pavitra Leelavati, Sattano Mad, Uma Devdi, Ramviyog, Veenaveli, Santanona Vanke, Rukshamani Haran, Sati Damayanti and Vijayavijay. He played several comedic duos with Chhagan Romeo.

When Mumbai Gujarati Natak Mandali became defunct, Nayak joined Palitana Bhaktipradarshak Mandali and Prabhat Kalamandal. When these troupes also became defunct, he went to Ahmedabad and joined Natmandal, which was operated by Gujarat Vidhya Sabha. Here he was guided by Rasiklal Parikh, Jaishankar Sundari and Dina Pathak. He received acclaim for his performance as a Brahmin in Rasiklal Parikh's Mena Gurjari (Mena of Gujarat, 1953) and as a comic role of Jivram Bhatt in Dalpatram's Mithyabhiman (False Vanity, 1955). He also briefly worked with Darpana Academy of Performing Arts. He taught theatre at Shreyas Foundation in Ahmedabad for some time. During the last years of his life, Nayak started a theatre troupe called Pran Theatre, which performed educational plays for schoolchildren.

Nayak acted as a royal astrologer in the Gujarati film Bhavni Bhavai. Apart from acting and direction, Nayak wrote eight plays including Balotiyana Balela, Bandh Chheepna Moti, Birbalni Chhatri and Balbhakta Prahalad. His notes on commercial theatre and its history, documentation on Bhavai acts and notes of his experiences are archived in the Theatre Media Centre. His few images are also archived in the Gujarat Lokkala Foundation.

In Pransukh Nayak: Flashback, Jitendra Thakkar notes that Pransukh Nayak made 1,050 performances with Deshi Natak Samaj, 400 with Vidhyavinod Natak Samaj, 205 with Aryaniti Natak Samaj, 325 in Hindi and 7,978 in Gujarati with Mumbai Gujarati Natak Mandali, 1,248 with Prabhat Kalamandal, 30 with Rangmandal, 531 with Natmandal, 412 with Darpana, 338 with Pran Theatre and 9,938 with other theatre companies—totalling 22,455 performances. The record was recorded in the 1989 Guinness Book of Records.

Pransukh Nayak died from cancer on 12 March 1989 in Ahmedabad.

Recognition 
He was awarded Sangeet Natak Akademi Award in 1974. On 13 September 1963, he was felicitated in Ahmedabad by Gujarat State Sangeet Natak Akademi. His 60th year was celebrated under Vadilal Kamdar, Mayor of Ahmedabad. He was felicitated by Vadodara Municipal Corporation as well.

Acting career 

He acted in following plays:

Notes

References 

Indian male stage actors
Indian theatre directors
Indian male dramatists and playwrights
Indian male musical theatre actors
Gujarati theatre
1910 births
1989 deaths
Gujarati people
20th-century Indian dramatists and playwrights
Male actors from Gujarat
20th-century Indian male actors
Dramatists and playwrights from Gujarat
20th-century Indian male writers
Gujarati-language writers
Deaths from cancer in India
20th-century Indian male singers
20th-century Indian singers
Recipients of the Sangeet Natak Akademi Award